Sportal was a company  of the dotcom boom at the end of the 1990s. Founded by Rob Hersov, and backed by BSkyB and Silvio Berlusconi's Fininvest among others, the company, originally called Pangolin, acquired rights to host a many official websites of Europe's leading football clubs (including Real Madrid, Juventus, AC Milan and Bayern Munich) as well as lower-profile sites across a number of other sports. It also opened offices across Europe, in South Africa, and in Australia.

In December 1999 it was valued at $170 million, and in the summer of 2000 it was named as the Sunday Times's #1 web company at the same time it ran the website for Euro 2000. 

In November, what remained of the company was sold for £190,000 to 365 Media Group (then known as ukbetting plc). 365 initially continued Sportal as sports content site then in 2002 relaunched the brand as a multi-sports broadband video portal sportal.com. 

In 2008, Sportal also opened its office in Mumbai and their Indian-centric website, www.sportal.co.in, was launched in November 2010.

British sport websites